The 2023 Nigerian presidential election in Kaduna State will be held on 25 February 2023 as part of the nationwide 2023 Nigerian presidential election to elect the president and vice president of Nigeria. Other federal elections, including elections to the House of Representatives and the Senate, will also be held on the same date while state elections will be held two weeks afterward on 11 March.

Background
Kaduna State is a large, diverse northwestern state with a growing economy and vast natural areas but facing an underdeveloped agricultural sector and intense challenges in security as the nationwide kidnapping epidemic, bandit conflict, inter-ethnic violence, and herder–farmer clashes have all heavily affected the state.

Politically, the 2019 elections were categorized as a slight solidification of the Kaduna APC's control as Governor Nasir Ahmad el-Rufai won re-election with over 55% of the vote and the party retained its House of Assembly majority. Federally, the APC regained two of the three Senate seats it lost due to defections and won eleven of the sixteen House of Representatives seats. For the presidency, Kaduna was won by APC nominee Muhammadu Buhari with about 60% but swung slightly towards the PDP. The 2019 elections also showed the political divide between the diverse, Christian-majority Southern region and the mainly Hausa and Fulani, Muslim-majority Northern and Central regions as the former region moved towards the PDP while the latter two regions stuck with the APC.

Polling

Projections

General election

Results

By senatorial district 
The results of the election by senatorial district.

By federal constituency
The results of the election by federal constituency.

By local government area 
The results of the election by local government area.

See also 
 2023 Kaduna State elections
 2023 Nigerian presidential election

Notes

References 

Kaduna State gubernatorial election
2023 Kaduna State elections
Kaduna